Athens Voice is a media company that includes the printed Athens Voice paper, the digital publication athensvoice.gr, the radio station Athens Voice Radio 102,5 and Athens Voice Books.

Overview
The Athens Voice paper is a free press weekly edition released every Thursday with a distribution network that includes Athens and Thessaloniki as well as 20 more cities in Greece. It was established in 2003.  By challenging artists of the domestic and the international art scene to create the cover page, Athens Voice also established one of the major art events of the city, “Art on the Front Page”, with an exhibition of the original artworks at the Benakis Museum.

Athens Voice and athensvoice.gr contain original material, articles and comments on current socio-political affairs, as well as stories on arts, books, fashion, urban culture, travel, events, nightlife and culinary trends. The online version, with over 2,5 million monthly unique visitors, combines the articles published in the print version together with new material. 

Athens Voice Radio 102.5 FM began broadcasting in 2017.

It has expanded through extra editions (Lookmag for women, Homemag for home and design, the Thessaloniki-based monthly magazine Soul for young lifestyle, the Summer and Winter Guides), the organizing of cultural events (the cover exhibition at the Benakis Museum, First Sound live music) and its participation in others (Fashion Week, European Music Day).  

Its annual travel guides (City & Islands Summer Guide) are published in English. The English online version bestofathens.gr and bestofthessaloniki.gr combines the articles published in the print version with additional travel material.

External links
 Athens Voice (official site)

Publications established in 2003
Weekly newspapers published in Greece
Greek-language newspapers
Newspapers published in Athens